Causeur is a French news magazine. It was created on November 15, 2007, by journalist Élisabeth Lévy and historian Gil Mihaely, as well as philosophers Alain Finkielkraut, Paul Thibaud and Peter Sloterdijk. The magazine claims to be pluralist, anti-conformist, reactionary and advocates a moderate liberalism on the economic level.

A monthly print version has been published since June 2008, and distributed to newsagents since April 4, 2013.

History

The Causeur website was created on November 15, 2007, by journalist Élisabeth Lévy, historian Gil Mihaely, and philosophers Alain Finkielkraut, Paul Thibaud and Peter Sloterdijk. Causeur also hosts several blogs.

A monthly print version has been published since June 2008, and distributed to newsagents since April 4, 2013.

During the campaign leading up to the 2012 French presidential election, a weekly "battle" pitted a Causeur journalist against a representative of Rue, in partnership with Yahoo.

References

External links
Causeur.fr (Official website) (in French)

News magazines published in France
Political magazines published in France
Magazines established in 2007